Three Days or 3 Days may refer to:

Religion
The Three Days: Maundy Thursday, Good Friday, and the Vigil of Easter
Three day movement

Film and Television

Film
Three Days (1992 film)
Three Days (1999 film), a rockumentary of the Jane's Addiction 1997 Relapse tour
Three Days (2001 film)
Three Days (2008 film), the Spanish film Tres días by director Francisco Javier Gutiérrez
Three Days (2011 film)

Television
, a South Korean documentary program
Three Days (TV series), a thriller action South Korean television drama

Music
Three Days (album), by Pat Green
Three Days (Jane's Addiction song), 1990
"Three Days" (Willie Nelson song), by Willie Nelson, also recorded by Faron Young 1962 and k.d. lang 1989
"Three Days", a 1991 song by Toni Childs from House of Hope
"Three Days", a 2017 song by Dream Theater from The Astonishing